Westferry Circus is a road interchange and public space within the Westferry Complex and is part of the Canary Wharf commercial estate positioned between Limehouse and Millwall in London, and contains a two-level road interchange. There are two roundabouts, one above the other. It was designed by Laurie Olin. In this context, a circus, from the Latin word meaning "circle", is a round open space at a street junction.

Notable buildings on the street include 11 Westferry Circus and 15 Westferry Circus.

Tower Hamlets Council pays for the lighting in the lower roundabout, which is on all the time. This costs £34,800 per annum.

References

Roundabouts in England
Road junctions in London
Canary Wharf